"The Show Must Go On" is a song by British rock band Queen, featured as the twelfth and final track on their 1991 album, Innuendo. It is credited to Queen, but written mainly by Brian May. The song chronicles the effort of frontman Freddie Mercury continuing to perform despite approaching the end of his life, although his diagnosis with AIDS had not yet been made public in spite of ongoing media speculation claiming that he was seriously ill. When the band recorded the song in 1990, Mercury's condition had deteriorated to the point that May had concerns as to whether he was physically capable of singing it. May recalls; "I said, 'Fred, I don't know if this is going to be possible to sing.' And he went, 'I'll fucking do it, darling'—vodka down—and went in and killed it, completely lacerated that vocal".

It was released as a single in the United Kingdom on 14 October 1991 in promotion for the Greatest Hits II album, just six weeks before Mercury died. Following Mercury's death on 24 November 1991, the song re-entered the British charts and spent as many weeks in the top 75 (five) as it did upon its original release, initially reaching a peak of 16. A live version with Elton John on vocals appeared on Queen's Greatest Hits III album.

The song was first played live on 20 April 1992, during The Freddie Mercury Tribute Concert, performed by the three remaining members of Queen, with Elton John singing lead vocals and Black Sabbath guitarist Tony Iommi playing rhythm guitar. It has since been played live by Queen + Paul Rodgers and Queen + Adam Lambert with Rodgers citing one of the performances as the best of his career. Since its release, the song has appeared on television, film (including an operatic version in Moulin Rouge!), and has been covered by a number of artists. In 2014, CBC's Hockey Night In Canada used the song in their closing montage after the Los Angeles Kings won the Stanley Cup, in the final CBC NHL game before Rogers Sportsnet took over.

History and recording
After listening to John Deacon and Roger Taylor playing the chord sequence that later on would be the basis for almost the entire song, Brian May sat down with Freddie Mercury and the two of them decided the theme of the song and wrote some lyrics. May wrote down the rest of the words as well as the melody, and added a bridge with a chord sequence inspired by Pachelbel's Canon. May was convinced the song's title was too predictable and offered to change it, but Mercury refused.

Demo versions featured May singing, having to sing some parts in falsetto because they were too high. When May presented the final demo to Mercury, he had doubts that Mercury would be physically capable of singing the song's highly demanding vocal line, due to the extent of his illness at the time. To May's surprise, when the time came to record the vocals, Mercury consumed a measure of vodka and said "I'll fucking do it, darling!" then proceeded to perform the vocal line.

May sang most of the backing vocals (including the last line) and played Korg M1 synthesiser as well as guitar. Producer David Richards suggested the key-shift in the second verse.

The lyrics are full of allusions, metaphors and other figures of speech, making it somewhat difficult to understand. Thinly disguised tragedy ahead is announced. In the end, the text refers to the determination, the furious desire to live ("I have to find the will to carry on with the show") in spite of vanishing strength ("inside my heart is breaking, my make-up may be flaking"). From the perspective of harmony, the song begins in B minor; then there is a modulation to C# Minor as if the song implied a hope (an increase of tone); but eventually it falls back to B minor.

Jim Hutton, Mercury's partner who was with him for the last 6 years until his death, mentions the lyric that refers to the use of make up during his last days:

Promotional video
Due to Mercury having contracted HIV/AIDS, his health started to rapidly deteriorate; as a result, no new footage of the lead singer was shot. The music video instead consisted of a montage of clips spanning Queen's music videos from 1981 to 1991, as a precursor to the imminent release of the band's Greatest Hits II album spanning that period. Footage from promo videos from the 1980s are shown in the montage, apart from "Under Pressure" and "Hammer to Fall", including "I Want to Break Free", "Friends Will Be Friends", "I'm Going Slightly Mad", "Breakthru", "Radio Ga Ga", "The Miracle", "The Invisible Man", "Headlong", "Calling All Girls", "Body Language", "Innuendo", "Back Chat", "Who Wants to Live Forever", "Scandal" and "One Vision". This, along with the manner of the song's lyrics, continued to fuel long-running media reports that Mercury was seriously ill, although it was still officially denied that anything was seriously wrong. The following month, Mercury finally announced that he was suffering from AIDS, and he died barely 24 hours after this announcement. The music video was compiled and edited by Austrian director team DoRo, consisting of Rudi Dolezal and Hannes Rossacher.

Live recordings
 During the Freddie Mercury Tribute Concert at Wembley Stadium, London in 1992, the surviving members of Queen along with Elton John and Tony Iommi of Black Sabbath performed "The Show Must Go On". The concert was later released on DVD in 2002 for the 10th anniversary.
 At the Théâtre National de Chaillot, Paris in 1997, Queen performed the song with Elton John and the Béjart Ballet, which is available in Queen's Greatest Hits III. This was also Queen's last-ever event to include bassist John Deacon; he retired from music after this performance.
 The 2006 VH1 Rock Honors at the Mandalay Bay Events Center in Las Vegas, featured Queen + Paul Rodgers performing "The Show Must Go On", along with "Under Pressure", "We Will Rock You" and "We Are the Champions" as a live broadcast.
 At the 2011 MTV Europe Music Awards, Queen closed the awards ceremony, with Adam Lambert on vocals, performing "The Show Must Go On", "We Will Rock You" and "We Are the Champions".
 On 28 August 2020, Queen + Adam Lambert released a live version of the song recorded at the O2 Arena in London on 4 July 2018 as a teaser for the live album Live Around the World.

Track listing
7-inch single
"The Show Must Go On" – 4:31
"Keep Yourself Alive" – 3:46

12-inch and CD single
"The Show Must Go On" – 4:31
"Keep Yourself Alive" – 3:46
"Queen Talks" – 1:43
"Body Language" (CD singles only) – 4:32

Limited CD single
"The Show Must Go On" – 4:31
"Now I'm Here" – 4:12
"Fat Bottomed Girls" – 4:15
"Las Palabras de Amor" – 4:30

Personnel
Freddie Mercury – lead vocals
Brian May – electric guitar, keyboards, programming, backing vocals
Roger Taylor – drums, backing vocals
John Deacon – bass guitar

Charts and certifications

Weekly charts

Year-end charts

Certifications and sales

Celine Dion version

Celine Dion recorded a studio version of Queen's "The Show Must Go On" and released it as a digital single on 20 May 2016. The track features Lindsey Stirling on violin.

Background and release
In 2007, Dion performed "The Show Must Go On" as a tribute to Freddie Mercury on a TF1 TV Special with French singers, Christophe Maé and David Hallyday. Dion performed the song live during her Taking Chances World Tour in 2008, paying tribute to Queen and Mercury. Her performance was released on Taking Chances World Tour: The Concert and Celine: Through the Eyes of the World in 2010. Since 2015, she has performed "The Show Must Go On" for her Las Vegas residency show, Celine.

Dion also performed the song during the 2016 Billboard Music Awards on 22 May 2016, where she received the Icon Award. It was her first performance outside the Colosseum at Caesars Palace since her husband, René Angélil died in January 2016. The performance received rave reviews. It was released on YouTube and Vevo on 3 June 2016. Dion also performed "The Show Must Go On" during her 2016 and 2017 tours.

On 20 May 2016, "The Show Must Go On" was released on iTunes, Amazon.com and other digital platforms, and became available on streaming services, including YouTube and Vevo.

Commercial performance
In France, "The Show Must Go On" debuted at number twenty-three, selling 1,000 copies in the first week. In Canada, it entered the Hot Digital Songs chart at number twenty-three as well. "The Show Must Go On" also debuted at number eighty-nine on the Canadian Hot 100. In Quebec, Dion entered the ADISQ chart at the top. In the US, "The Show Must Go On" entered the Pop Digital Songs chart at number forty-five. In Belgium Wallonia, it peaked at number forty-seven on the Ultratip chart.

Charts

Release history

References

External links
Official YouTube videos: Queen + Paul Rodgers, at Freddie Mercury Tribute Concert (with Elton John and Tony Iommi)

Lyrics at Queen official website

Songs about death
Songs about HIV/AIDS
Songs about theatre
1991 singles
1991 songs
2016 singles
Celine Dion songs
Columbia Records singles
Hollywood Records singles
Parlophone singles
EMI Records singles
Hard rock ballads
Songs written by Brian May
Queen (band) songs
1990s ballads